KORN (1490 kHz, KORN News Radio 1490) is an AM radio station licensed to serve Mitchell, South Dakota.  The station is owned by Nancy and Steve Nedved, through licensee Nedved Media, LLC. It airs a full service format with a mix of news, talk and sports. The station offers a mix of local and syndicated programming including shows hosted by Rush Limbaugh, Sean Hannity, Ray Lucia, Jim Bohannon, and "Coast to Coast AM" with George Noory. It also features syndicated sports programing from ABC News Radio and Fox Sports Radio.

The station is the home of the Mitchell High School Kernels sports broadcasts, and is also the local affiliate for South Dakota State Jackrabbits sporting events (mainly football and men's & women's basketball) through Learfield Sports.

The station was assigned the call letters KORN by the Federal Communications Commission.

History

The station was originally given the call sign KMHK, and went on the air between August and October 1947. For a few months in late 1950, the station used the call sign KORM. In 1950, after the call letters KORN had been given up by a station in Fremont, Nebraska that had recently become KFGT (and has subsequently become KHUB), the call sign KORN became available and was taken by the former KORM to take advantage of the tie-in with the Corn Palace.

Famed radio announcer Gary Owens, of Rowan & Martin's Laugh-In fame, started his radio career at KORN in 1952, where he served as News Director.

Ownership
In February 2008, Riverfront Broadcasting LLC of Yankton, South Dakota reached an agreement with NRG Media to purchase this station as part of a six station deal.

In late 2016, Riverfront Broadcasting LLC sold the station, along with sister stations KQRN, and KORN-FM to Nancy & Steve Nedved. Effective Sunday, January 1, 2017, the three station group is now known as Nedved Media, LLC.

Honors and awards
In May 2006, KORN received two first place plaques in the commercial radio division of the South Dakota Associated Press Broadcasters Association news contest. The contest was for the 2005 calendar year.

References

External links
KORN official website

ORN (AM)
Mass media in the Mitchell, South Dakota micropolitan area
News and talk radio stations in the United States
Radio stations established in 1947
1947 establishments in South Dakota